George Calil (died 1967) was a Lebanese businessman who operated his business in the Nigerian city of Kano. He was a major groundnut trader in the 1940s–1960s, and was one of the earliest entrepreneurs who invested in manufacturing units in the city of Kano and other parts of the country.

Career
George Calil arrived in Kano in 1928, and soon joined the groundnuts trade. He was able to win minimal concessions from the commodity control boards which allowed him to become a produce agent.  He settled in Kano with his family in the 1920s, with two sons and five daughters.

He established an experimental groundnut crushing factory in 1941 in Kano. He founded Nigerian Oil Mills in 1951, which is an oil processing mill in Kano. He later established a few foundries producing tea kettles and silver plates and supplying casting materials to the Nigerian Railway Corporation and a few other local plants. 

In 1959, he incorporated a company to select quality nuts for the overseas confectionary trade.

Personal life
Calil was fluent in fourteen languages. He died of stomach cancer in 1966. He died in 1967, and his business was transferred to his sons, Ely Calil and Bernard Calil.

References

1967 deaths
Year of birth missing
20th-century Nigerian businesspeople
George